"Who Do U Love" is a song performed by Canadian singer Deborah Cox. It was written and produced by Larry "Rock" Campbell and Vassal Benford for her self-titled debut studio album (1995) and contains a sample of "Hold You Tight" by Tara Kemp, as written by Jake Smith, Tuhin Roy, and William Hammond. Arista Records issued the song as the second album's single in 1996.

"Who Do U Love"  peaked at number 17 on the US Billboard Hot 100 and was Cox's first number-one hit on the Billboard Dance Club Songs chart. Internationally, it reached number two in New Zealand, number 11 in Australia, number 15 in Canada, and number 31 in the United Kingdom. The song is certified Platinum in New Zealand and Gold in Australia.

Critical reception
Larry Flick from Billboard wrote, "Cox comes on with another winning single that coasts on the fuel of a sleek jeep funk groove and a sing-along chorus. Comparisons to labelmate Whitney Houston may continue, but Cox goes a long way toward proving that she has her own special style that stands alone. Over the course of the single's four nicely varied versions, she displays different parts of her personality and vocal palette. Most notably, she shows a sassy edge on Chucky Thompson's spare hip-hop mix, then forceful diva potential on David Morales' splashy pop/house interpretation. Pick a version of this cutie and slam it over and over."

Music video
The official music video for the song was directed by Brett Ratner and was filmed on the Paramount Studios lot in Los Angeles. It consists of Cox confronting her boyfriend (portrayed by Flex Alexander) for being unfaithful. It begins with Cox in her apartment, being confronted by her friends, who claim that Cox's boyfriend ("Flex") was out and cheating on her the night before. Cox denies it at first, until she hears her boyfriend outside her apartment with his friends. She tries to confront him, but he quickly gets defensive, so Cox's replies "Forget You". Walking down the fire escape with her friends, Cox begins to sing and dance in sync with her friends, as she walks away from Flex. Throughout, he keeps trying to win her back, but in the end, Cox refuses Flex's hand and walks away. The video ends with Flex miming "Damn!".

The dancing in the music video was choreographered by Tina Landon. The video features Nikki Pantenburg, Tish Oliver, Shawnette Heard, and Kelly Konno, all of whom were dancers for Janet Jackson during her janet. era. Landon, herself, who also was Jackson's choreographer at the time, is amongst the background dancers in the video, and can be seen in the last dance sequence of the video.

Track listings
 US CD and cassette single
 "Who Do U Love" (Gass mix) – 4:26
 "Who Do U Love" (Morales mix) – 4:45

 UK, European and Australian CD single
 "Who Do U Love" (radio edit) – 3:59
 "Who Do U Love" (Morales classic club mix) – 8:42
 "Who Do U Love" (Driza Bone remix) – 4:08
 "Who Do U Love" (Gass mix) – 3:59
 "Who Do U Love" (Driza Bone extended mix) – 5:10
 "Who Do U Love" (Morales Down Low dub) – 6:11

Credits and personnel
Credits are taken from the US CD single liner notes.

Studios
 Recorded at Palm Tree Studios (North Hollywood, California, US) and Battery Studios (New York City)
 Mixed at Palm Tree Studios (North Hollywood, California, US)

Personnel

 Deborah Cox – vocals, background vocals
 Larry "Rock" Campbell – writing, production, arrangement
 Vassal Benford – writing, additional production
 Chris Trevett – recording
 Ara Darakjian – recording
 Victor Flores – recording, mixing
 Jon Gass – remixing
 Fred Kelly – remixing assistant
 Clive Davis – executive production
 Christopher Stern – art direction
 Ken Banks – photography
 Carlton Jones – styling

Charts

Weekly charts

Year-end charts

Certifications

Release history

References

External links
 
 

1995 singles
1995 songs
1996 singles
Arista Records singles
Deborah Cox songs
Music videos directed by Brett Ratner
Songs written by Vassal Benford